Aleksei Nikolayevich Germashov (born 28 September 1982) is a Russian professional football coach and a former player.

Club career
He played seven seasons in the Russian Football National League for five different clubs.

References

External links
 

1982 births
People from Volgodonsk
Living people
Russian footballers
Association football defenders
FC Lada-Tolyatti players
FC Baltika Kaliningrad players
FC Fakel Voronezh players
FC Tyumen players
Russian football managers
FC Torpedo Vladimir players
FC Nosta Novotroitsk players
FC Volga Ulyanovsk players
Sportspeople from Rostov Oblast